Big Brother is a Canadian reality television series, which aired on V in the Canadian province of Quebec in 2010. Based on the international Big Brother franchise, it was produced as a spinoff of the network's long-running Loft Story.

The host was TV presenter Chéli Sauvé-Castonguay and lasted 63 days. The season launched on March 14, 2010, with fifteen housemates entering the house on Day 1. This series was the first international version to follow the American format in which the game is played internally, but with slight variations.

Aside from the main show, there was an accompanying show that aired every Sunday on V. The show was hosted by journalist Pascale Levesque. The winner of Loft Story: La Revanche, Sébastien Tremblay, blogged daily about the show on its official website.

There were no plans for a follow-up season that have been announced for a decade. However, on August 24, 2020, it was announced that the show would be revived for a celebrity version in winter 2021 on Noovo.

Format
Big Brother Quebec loosely followed the format of the American version in that the housemates mostly decided who would stay and who would go. However, there were slight differences:

Numéro 1
The Numéro 1 (English: Number 1) was similar to the Head of Household position in the American version. Numéro 1 was exempt from eviction and enjoyed certain luxuries. They were also required to nominate two housemates for eviction.

Numéro 2
The Numéro 2 (English: Number 2) was a unique feature to Big Brother Quebec. Numéro 2 was selected by Numéro 1. Despite being immune from eviction and enjoying certain luxuries, they were forced to sleep at the foot of Numéro 1's bed, lest they lose their power and privilege. In addition, Numéro 2 was required to choose a third housemate to nominate for eviction.

Pouvoir de Véto
The Pouvoir de Véto (English: Power of Veto) worked similarly to the Power of Veto in the US, in that the winner could use it to save a nominee; however, unlike the American version, the Veto winner decided the replacement nominee. On occasion, there would be two Vetoes available to win instead of the usual one, this would generally be weeks that the public voted to evict.

Food competitions
Food competitions were similar to the current Have and Have Not competitions in the US. The winners received desired food items, such as steak, bread, vegetables, and dairy, while the losers dined on slop.

Evictions
Unlike most seasons of the American addition, three housemates faced eviction each week. On eviction nights, the three nominees were moved to a special room to hear the results of the vote, instead of sitting on designated chairs in the living room. Finally, all housemates except Numéro 1 voted to evict, unlike the US, where the two nominees cannot vote, and the Head of Household votes only in a tiebreaker situation. There were exceptions to this, however; the public on occasion had the opportunity to evict a housemate.

Grenade
Used in other international formats like the Australian version, the "grenade" was used by the newly evicted housemate to throw at any housemate of their choice. The grenade had different powers and these powers changed every week.

Finale
The finale was completely different from the American version. Six housemates were in the house on the final day, unlike 2 or 3 in the American version. Unlike the jury format used in the American version to decide the winner, like the original format, the viewing public decided on the winner. However the former and current housemate get to vote on which finalist should not win.

Housemates

Slop

Voting History

Notes

References

External links
 

Television shows filmed in Quebec
2010s Canadian reality television series
2010 Canadian television series debuts
2010 Canadian television series endings
Big Brother Canada
Noovo original programming
Television articles with disputed naming style
Canadian television series based on Dutch television series